The James Charnley Residence, also known as the Charnley-Persky House, is a historic house museum at 1365 North Astor Street in the Gold Coast neighborhood of Chicago, Illinois.  Built in 1892, it is one of the few surviving residential works of Louis Sullivan.

The house is owned and operated as a museum and organization headquarters by The Society of Architectural Historians (SAH). It was designated a National Historic Landmark in 1998, and is listed on the National Register of Historic Places.

Description
The Charnley Residence is located in Chicago's Gold Coast north of the commercial downtown, at the southeast corner of North Astor Street and East Schiller Street.  It is three stories in height, with a raised basement of stone and  stories of largely austere brickwork.  The facade is divided into three parts, the center portion housing the main entrance in a stone surround flanked by paired sash windows.  Above it is a projecting ornate wooden balcony that obscures the fact that the wall behind it is recessed.  The flanking sections each have single sash windows set on large expanses of brick, in deep rectangular openings with splayed soldier brick lintels.  The third level is separated from the lower levels by a stone stringcourse, and has two deeply recessed square windows in each section.

The interior of the house is a marked contrast to its relatively plain exterior.  It has high-quality woodwork throughout, with builtin bookcases featuring doors with glass of varying shapes and sizes.  The main library features a fireplace of African rose marble, and the dining room has extensive use of mahogany, a favorite wood of Louis Sullivan's.

History
The house was completed in 1892 for Charnley, a Chicago lumberman who lived in the house with his family for about a decade. It is a distinctive and original design of Sullivan's, in which a modern aesthetic was brought to an essentially Classical symmetrical form. Charnley and Sullivan were mutual friends as Sullivan designed vacation homes for them also in Mississippi.

The building was later owned by members of the Waller family, who invested in real estate. The house was purchased by the architectural firm of Skidmore, Owings and Merrill in 1986 and subsequently restored. Seymour Persky purchased the house in 1995 and donated it to the SAH who renamed the building to the Charnley–Persky House to honor their benefactor.

See also
List of National Historic Landmarks in Illinois
National Register of Historic Places listings in Central Chicago

References

Historic American Buildings Survey HABS ILL,16-CHIG,12-
 Richard Longstreth (ed.) 2004. The Charnley House: Louis Sullivan, Frank Lloyd Wright, and the Making of Chicago's Gold Coast, University of Chicago Press, 249 pages
 Storrer, William Allin. The Frank Lloyd Wright Companion. University Of Chicago Press, 2006,  (S.009)

External links
Charnley House Website
A site about the James Charnley House
High-resolution 360° Panoramas and Images of James Charnley House | Art Atlas

Frank Lloyd Wright buildings
Houses completed in 1892
Houses on the National Register of Historic Places in Chicago
Louis Sullivan buildings
National Historic Landmarks in Chicago
Museums in Chicago
Historic house museums in Illinois
1892 establishments in Illinois
Chicago Landmarks